Sri Fatmawati (born 7 June 1999) is an Indonesian badminton player from Jaya Raya Jakarta badminton club. She started her career as a badminton player when she was in the grade eight junior high school, and joined Pelatcab Abadi Probolinggo. Fatmawati who came from Tamansari village in Dringu, Probolinggo, represented East Java competed at the 2014 National Youth Games and won the gold medal in the singles event. She won her first senior international title at the 2016 Bahrain International tournament.

In 2022, she participated in the ASEAN University Games and won a gold medal in the women's singles and a silver medal in the women's team.

Achievements

BWF International Challenge/Series (6 titles) 
Women's singles

  BWF International Challenge tournament
  BWF International Series tournament

Performance timeline

Individual competitions 
 Senior level

References

External links 
 

1999 births
Living people
Sportspeople from East Java
Indonesian female badminton players
21st-century Indonesian women
20th-century Indonesian women